Jaffa (alternative name in Hebrew כלת הים transliteration Kalat Hayam, in Arabic عروس البحر transliteration "Arous el Bahr" both Hebrew and Arabic meaning "the bride of the sea") is a 2009 Israeli film directed by Keren Yedaya. A joint Israeli, French and German production, it was given a special screening at the 2009 Cannes Film Festival.

Plot
Jaffa is a mixed Arabic - Jewish seaside city near Tel Aviv, where Reuven Wolf (Moni Moshonov) has a garage for repairing cars. His wife Ossi (Ronit Elkabetz), a vain, self-centered woman, just makes everybody's life difficult.

The couple's daughter, Mali Wolf (Dana Ivgy), has secretly fallen in love with her childhood friend, the young Toufik (newcomer Mahmud Shalaby), a hard-working youth who has come as a helping hand to his Israeli-Arab father Hassan, a long-time mechanic working for Reuven. Meanwhile, Reuven's son Meir (Roy Assaf) resents working in the garage and further resents the presence of Arab Palestinian Toufik, and bullies him around.

In a most tragic night, everybody's life is changed. Meir and his mother have a grave argument and she throws him out. Next morning, a crisis erupts between Meir and Toufik with the latter fatally injuring Meir in an unfortunate accident. This cancels the plan the already pregnant Mali and her lover Toufik had made to elope. Although she decides to have an abortion so as not to have a baby from her brother's killer, she eventually decides to keep the baby, concealing that the child is from Toufik, and the devastated Wolf family moves to Ramat Gan.

The story picks up after 9 years, when Toufik is released from jail and Mali Wolf is torn between allegiance to her family who has helped her raise the illegitimate child Shiran (Lili Ivgy) and her lover Toufik.

Cast
 Dana Ivgy as Mali Wolf
 Moni Moshonov as Reuven Wolf
 Ronit Elkabetz as Osnat 'Ossi' Wolf
 Mahmud Shalaby as Toufik
 Hussein Yassin Mahajne as Hassan
 Roy Assaf as Meir Wolf  
 Dalia Beger as Aunt Suzi
 Lili Ivgy as Shiran Wolf
 Zenabh Mahrab as Naima
 Suma Zenabh as Evtesam

References

External links
 Jaffa section in Rezo Films official site 
 

2009 films
2009 drama films
2000s Hebrew-language films
Israeli–Palestinian conflict films
Films shot in Israel
Israeli drama films